Parashar Lake (also spelled Prashar Lake) is a freshwater lake located at an altitude of  in the Mandi district of Himachal Pradesh, India. It contains a floating island inside it.

History 
The lake is considered sacred to the sage  Parashara, who meditated here back then. The temple was built in the 13th century by Raja Ban Sen of Mandi in honor of the sage and thus, considering the Himachali architecture, the lake was named after him.

Details
With deep blue waters, the lake is held sacred to the sage Parashar and he is regarded to have meditated there. Surrounded by snow-capped peaks and looking down on the fast flowing river Beas, the lake can be approached from Mandi or from Bajaura in Kullu Valley. There is a round, floating island in the lake, which is a common natural phenomenon found all around the world. It is composed of plant matter in various stages of decomposition, and is held aloft by the oxygen in its plants' roots. The floating island moves in all directions in the lake. The floating land covers 7% of the area of the lake.

The temple was built in the thirteenth century and legend has it was built by a baby from a single tree.  Until now no one has determined the depth of Prashar Lake.  It is said that a diver is not able to determine its depth.

Mythology
It is believed that Sage Prashar meditated on the banks of this lake, hence it is named Prashar Lake. Bhima, one of the Pandava brothers, had created the lake, the story says.  After the Kurukshetra / Mahabharat war, the Pandavas were returning with Lord Kamrunag. When they reached this place, Kamrunag loved the tranquil surroundings and decided to live here forever. So, Bheem (the strongest of the lot) rammed his elbow on one of the mountains and created a big dent in the land. This dent became Prashar Lake.

Geography 
The maximum depth of the lake remains unknown.

Gallery

Views of Prashar Lake, Temple and surroundings

Flora of Prashar Lake

Notes

References

External links

Himachal Pradesh Tourism Department

Lakes of Himachal Pradesh
Geography of Mandi district
Sacred lakes of India